The 1998 Arab Cup is the seventh edition of the Arab Cup hosted by Qatar. Saudi Arabia won their first title.

Qualifying format
  qualified as hosts. 
  qualified as holders. 
  and  qualified as World Cup qualifiers.
 The Qualifying Stage is divided into 4 Groups based on the Geography regions, the groups are: The Levant, The Gulf, The Red sea and The North Africa group, Top teams qualify to the 1998 Arab Cup.

Qualification

Group A (Gulf Region)

 Bahrain and Oman withdrew.
 Kuwait and United Arab Emirates qualified for finals.

Group B (Red Sea Region)

 Yemen, Somalia and Comoros withdrew.
 Sudan qualified for finals.

Group C (North Africa Region)

 Tunisia and Mauritania withdrew.
 Algeria and Libya qualified for finals.

Group D (East Region)
 disqualified

External links
Details in RSSSF
More Details 

qualification